James Matthew Allan (born 3 June 1972) is a New Zealand former cricketer. He played in 16 first-class matches and one List A match for Otago between 1993/94 and 1997/98.

References

External links
 

1972 births
Living people
New Zealand cricketers
Otago cricketers
People from Waimate
Cricketers from Canterbury, New Zealand